Matt Wu Chung-tien (born July 5, 1981) is a Taiwanese actor, film director and screenwriter.

His short film Stairway (四十三階) won Best Asian Short Film Award at the 19th Busan International Film Festival in 2014.

Personal life
In 2006, he co-wrote a book with Kingone Wang titled Men's Talk (型男Talk).

Wu married actress Yang Zishan in 2015. They met while starring in a 7-minute romantic drama in Taiwan as the 12th segment of the web series Female Zodiac Stories (清蜜星體驗女生版).

Filmography

Film

As actor

As filmmaker

Television

References

External links

1981 births
Living people
Taiwanese male television actors
Taiwanese male film actors
Taiwanese film directors
Taiwanese screenwriters
21st-century Taiwanese male actors
Taiwanese male stage actors
National Taiwan University of Arts alumni